Taw Mim Semkath (Syriac: ܬܡܣ T.M.S., originally ܒܝܬ ܝܬܡܐ ܕܐܬܘܪܝܐ ܒܩܝܠܝܩܝܐ Beth Yatme d-Othuroye b-Qiliqiya), also known as  Assyrian National School Association (ANSA) after its founding organisation, is an Assyrian school and orphanage that opened in Adana in 1919 for orphaned Assyrian children who survived the Assyrian genocide. The Assyrian National School Association, established in Stirling, New Jersey in 1899 by Assyrian immigrants from Diyarbakir who fled the massacre in 1895, founded the school with help from the French High Commissioner. The Syriac Orthodox bishop Yuhanon Dolabani was an important figure at the school, contributing a lot with teaching and organizing. In 1921, the school was closed by the Turkish authorities and moved to Beirut, Lebanon, where it is still running.

References

External links
Assyrian Orphanage and School Association of America

Schools in Beirut
Orphanages in Turkey
Educational institutions established in 1919
Child-related organisations in Lebanon
1919 establishments in the Ottoman Empire